Lyrosoma opacum is a species of primitive carrion beetle in the family Agyrtidae. It is found in Europe and Northern Asia (excluding China) and North America.

References

Further reading

External links

 

Staphylinoidea
Articles created by Qbugbot
Beetles described in 1853